Rose Hill, also known as Timberlake House, is a historic plantation house located near Louisburg, Franklin County, North Carolina.  The main block was built about 1803, and is a two-story, five bay, transitional Georgian / Federal style frame dwelling.  It has a gable roof and double-shouldered brick end chimneys.  A rear ell was expanded about 1840, and about 1880 a one-story Queen Anne-style, full width verandah was added. About 1910, a Neoclassical portico was added over the verandah, as was a bathroom wing.  Also on the property are the contributing slave quarter (c. 1840), kitchen (c. 1840), playhouse (c. 1910), and generator / wellhouse (c. 1910).

It was listed on the National Register of Historic Places in 2006.

References

Plantation houses in North Carolina
Houses on the National Register of Historic Places in North Carolina
Georgian architecture in North Carolina
Federal architecture in North Carolina
Queen Anne architecture in North Carolina
Neoclassical architecture in North Carolina
Houses completed in 1803
Houses in Franklin County, North Carolina
National Register of Historic Places in Franklin County, North Carolina